Khamis El sakara is a Lebanese holiday. The name is from Lebanese Arabic. It is celebrated on the last Thursday before the first day of Lent, when Lebanese Catholics gather and indulge in alcoholic beverages.

This is an old tradition where Christians gather to finish all their meat and dairy before the 40 days of fasting.

Wine was the traditional alcoholic beverage and people were happy to gather and drink a lot of wine.

انه خميس السكارى وليس خميس الذكارى ؛ نعم خميس السكارى وهو ليس بعيد ديني انما هو منبثق من عادات وتقاليد لدى المسيحين القدامى الذين كانوا يجتمعون من نهار الخميس لينهوا كل ما لديهم من مونة من البان واجبان ولحوم طوال ٤ ايام لعدم وجود برادات لحفظ اللحوم والاكل حينها ؛ وكان النبيذ هو المشروب الروحي الاول وكان البعض من فرط فرحتهم بلقاء العائلة وبساطة العيش يفرطون بشرب النبيذ من هنا اتت التسمية؛ كلمة الذكارى غير موجودة في المعجم العربي ؛ويحاول البعض ربطها بعيد تذكار الموتى الا ان الكنيسة خصصت اسبوع كامل لتذكار الموتى قبل بدء الصوم.ولا توجد اي ديانة سماوية تحبذ السكر بل هي عادات متوارثة فلا داعي من الخجل في التسمية الصحيحة،.

Society of Lebanon
Arab cuisine